The 1925–26 Pittsburgh Pirates season was the first season of the new Pirates ice hockey team in the National Hockey League. The club made the playoffs in its first season after placing third in the league. The Pirates lost in the playoffs to the eventual Stanley Cup champion Montreal Maroons.

Off-season
In October, the team signed former Montreal Canadiens player Odie Cleghorn as their new playing coach.

Regular season

Final standings

Record vs. opponents

Playoffs
The Pirates qualified for the playoffs and faced the Montreal Maroons in a two-game total goals series. In game one at Montreal, Montreal won 3–1. In game two, Pittsburgh tied 3–3 and Montreal won the series 6–4.

Schedule and results

Montreal wins total goals series 6 goals to 4

Player stats

Regular season
Scoring

Goaltending

Playoffs
Scoring

Goaltending

Note: GP = Games played; G = Goals; A = Assists; Pts = Points; +/- = Plus/minus; PIM = Penalty minutes; PPG=Power-play goals; SHG=Short-handed goals; GWG=Game-winning goals
      MIN=Minutes played; W = Wins; L = Losses; T = Ties; GA = Goals against; GAA = Goals against average; SO = Shutouts;

Awards and records

Transactions

See also
1925–26 NHL season

References

Pittsburgh
Pittsburgh
Pittsburgh Pirates (NHL) seasons